Brian Wayne Phelps (born May 5, 1959) is an American radio personality (disc jockey) and occasional actor, best known for the nationally syndicated Mark & Brian morning show.

Brian began his acting career at Cambridge High School in Cambridge, Illinois, and appeared in the school's musicals, as well as being a member of the Cambridge Vikings football team. After graduating in 1977, Brian attended college in Normal, Illinois. After attending Illinois State University, Phelps did commercial work and improvisational comedy before meeting his partner Mark Thompson in Birmingham, Alabama in 1986. The next year the duo moved their show to KLOS-FM in Los Angeles.

The enormous popularity of his radio show has given Phelps several opportunities to branch out into other entertainment media. In 1991–92, he and Thompson hosted a short-lived NBC TV series, The Adventures of Mark & Brian, based on their radio show. Phelps has also appeared in several motion pictures, notably Jason Goes to Hell: The Final Friday (the 1993 ninth installment in the Friday the 13th series) and The Princess Diaries (2001). He has also made numerous TV series guest appearances, including the role of Reverend Gigg LeCarp on the Comedy Central series Reno 911!. Phelps often ended the Mark & Brian Show with the catch phrase "Be good humans!".

On August 17, 2012, after 25 years as the KLOS morning team, Mark and Brian signed off the air waves and closed their show. Brian debuted the podcast "The Brian and Jill  Show" on September 10, 2012 with his new partner, actress Jill Whelan.

On August 17, 2020 The Radio Hall of Fame has announced its list of inductees for its 2020 class. Longtime 95.5 KLOS Los Angeles morning hosts Mark Thompson and Brian Phelps (Longstanding Local/Regional). https://www.radiohalloffame.com/2020-inductees

External links

Mark & Brian Archive Site
Brian & Jill Official Website

American radio DJs
1959 births
Living people
Illinois State University alumni